Vertical farming is the practice of growing crops in vertically stacked layers. It often incorporates controlled-environment agriculture, which aims to optimize plant growth, and soilless farming techniques such as hydroponics, aquaponics, and aeroponics. Some common choices of structures to house vertical farming systems include buildings, shipping containers, tunnels, and abandoned mine shafts.

The modern concept of vertical farming was proposed in 1999 by Dickson Despommier, professor of Public and Environmental Health at Columbia University. Despommier and his students came up with a design of a skyscraper farm that could feed 50,000 people. Although the design has not yet been built, it successfully popularized the idea of vertical farming. 

The main advantage of utilizing vertical farming technologies is the increased crop yield that comes with a smaller unit area of land requirement. Another sought-after advantage is the increased ability to cultivate a larger variety of crops at once because crops do not share the same plots of land while growing. Additionally, crops are resistant to weather disruptions because of their placement indoors, meaning fewer crops are lost to extreme or unexpected weather occurrences. Because of its limited land usage, vertical farming is less disruptive to the native plants and animals, leading to further conservation of the local flora and fauna.

These advances have led vertical farming companies to raise unprecedented amounts of funding in North America as well as in other parts of the world such as the Middle East. Today, venture capitalists, governments, financial institutions, and private investors  are among the principal investors in the sector.

Vertical farming technologies face economic challenges with large start-up costs compared to traditional farms. In Victoria, Australia, a "hypothetical 10 level vertical farm" would cost over 850 times more per square meter of arable land than a traditional farm in rural Victoria. Vertical farms also face large energy demands due to the use of supplementary light like LEDs. Moreover, if non-renewable energy is used to meet these energy demands, vertical farms could produce more pollution than traditional farms or greenhouses.

Techniques

Hydroponics 
Hydroponics refers to the technique of growing plants without dirt. In hydroponic systems, the roots of plants are submerged in liquid solutions containing macronutrients, such as nitrogen, phosphorus, sulphur, potassium, calcium, and magnesium, as well as trace elements, including iron, chlorine, manganese, boron, zinc, copper, and molybdenum. Additionally, inert (chemically inactive) mediums such as gravel, sand, and sawdust are used as soil substitutes to provide support for the roots.

The advantages of hydroponics include the ability to increase yield per area and reduce water usage. A study has shown that, compared to conventional farming, hydroponic farming could increase the yield per area of lettuce by around 11 times while requiring 13 times less water. Due to these advantages, hydroponics is the predominant growing system used in vertical farming.

Aquaponics 
The term aquaponics is coined by combining two words: aquaculture, which refers to fish farming, and hydroponics—the technique of growing plants without soil. Aquaponics takes hydroponics one step further by integrating the production of terrestrial plants with the production of aquatic organisms in a closed-loop system that mimics nature itself. Nutrient-rich wastewater from the fish tanks is filtered by a solid removal unit and then led to a bio-filter, where toxic ammonia is converted to nutritious nitrate. While absorbing nutrients, the plants then purify the wastewater, which is recycled back to the fish tanks. Moreover, the plants consume carbon dioxide produced by the fish, and water in the fish tanks obtains heat and helps the greenhouse maintain temperature at night to save energy. As most commercial vertical farming systems focus on producing a few fast-growing vegetable crops, aquaponics, which also includes an aquacultural component, is currently not as widely used as conventional hydroponics.

Aeroponics 

The invention of aeroponics was motivated by the initiative of NASA (the National Aeronautical and Space Administration) to find an efficient way to grow plants in space in the 1990s. Unlike conventional hydroponics and aquaponics, aeroponics does not require any liquid or solid medium to grow plants. Instead, a liquid solution with nutrients is misted in air chambers where the plants are suspended. By far, aeroponics is the most sustainable soil-less growing technique, as it uses up to 90% less water than the most efficient conventional hydroponic systems and requires no replacement of growing medium. Moreover, the absence of growing medium allows aeroponic systems to adopt a vertical design, which further saves energy as gravity automatically drains away excess liquid, whereas conventional horizontal hydroponic systems often require water pumps for controlling excess solution. Currently, aeroponic systems have not been widely applied to vertical farming, but are starting to attract significant attention.

Controlled-environment agriculture 
Controlled-environment agriculture (CEA) is the modification of the natural environment to increase crop yield or extend the growing season. CEA systems are typically hosted in enclosed structures such as greenhouses or buildings, where control can be imposed on environmental factors including air, temperature, light, water, humidity, carbon dioxide, and plant nutrition. In vertical farming systems, CEA is often used in conjunction with soilless farming techniques such as hydroponics, aquaponics, and aeroponics.

Types

Building-based farms 

Abandoned buildings are often reused for vertical farming, such as a farm at Chicago called "The Plant", which was transformed from an old meatpacking plant. However, new builds are sometimes also constructed to house vertical farming systems.

Shipping-container vertical farms 

Recycled shipping containers are an increasingly popular option for housing vertical farming systems. The shipping containers serve as standardized, modular chambers for growing a variety of plants, and are often equipped with LED lighting, vertically stacked hydroponics, smart climate controls, and monitoring sensors. Moreover, by stacking the shipping containers, farms can save space even further and achieve higher yield per unit area.

Deep farms 
A "deep farm" is a vertical farm built from refurbished underground tunnels or abandoned mine shafts. As temperature and humidity underground are generally temperate and constant, deep farms require less energy for heating. Deep farms can also use nearby groundwater to reduce the cost of water supply. Despite low costs, a deep farm can produce seven to nine times more food than a conventional farm above ground on the same area of land, according to Saffa Riffat, chair in Sustainable Energy at the University of Nottingham. Coupled with automated harvesting systems, these underground farms can be fully self-sufficient.

Floating farms 
Floating platforms and barges have been proposed as sites for vertical farming in urban areas where land is scarce. The ongoing Science Barge project first demonstrated urban hydroponic agriculture in New York City in 2007, including several vertical farming systems. A much larger vision of sloped, floating skyscrapers has been proposed for Singapore. In this case, the unusual, angular design is intended to exploit the open space over the water to capture more sunlight.

History

Initial propositions 
Dickson Despommier, professor of Public and Environmental Health at Columbia University, founded the root of the concept of vertical farming. In 1999, he challenged his class of graduate students to calculate how much food they could grow on the rooftops of New York. The students concluded that they could only feed about 1000 people. Unsatisfied with the results, Despommier suggested growing plants indoors instead, on multiple layers vertically. Despommier and his students then proposed a design of a 30-story vertical farm equipped with artificial lighting, advanced hydroponics, and aeroponics that could produce enough food for 50,000 people. They further outlined that approximately 100 kinds of fruits and vegetables would grow on the upper floors while lower floors would house chickens and fish subsisting on the plant waste. Although Despommier's skyscraper farm has not yet been built, it popularized the idea of vertical farming and inspired many later designs.
2017 the design magazine eVolo awarded a farm/school tower design.

Implementations 
Developers and local governments in multiple cities have expressed interest in establishing a vertical farm: Incheon (South Korea), Abu Dhabi (United Arab Emirates), Dongtan (China), New York City, Portland, Los Angeles, Las Vegas, Seattle, Surrey, Toronto, Paris, Bangalore (India), Dubai, Shanghai, and Beijing. Around US$1.8 billion were invested into startups operating in the sector between 2014 and November 2020.

In 2009, the world's first pilot production system was installed at Paignton Zoo Environmental Park in the United Kingdom. The project showcased vertical farming and provided a solid base to research sustainable urban food production. The produce is used to feed the zoo's animals while the project enables evaluation of the systems and provides an educational resource to advocate for change in unsustainable land-use practices that impact upon global biodiversity and ecosystem services.

In 2010 the Green Zionist Alliance proposed a resolution at the 36th World Zionist Congress calling on Keren Kayemet L'Yisrael (Jewish National Fund in Israel) to develop vertical farms in Israel. Moreover, a company named "Podponics" built a vertical farm in Atlanta consisting of over 100 stacked "growpods" in 2010 but reportedly went bankrupt in May 2016.

In 2012 the world's first commercial vertical farm was opened in Singapore, developed by Sky Greens Farms, and is three stories high. They currently have over 100 nine-meter-tall towers.

In 2012, a company named The Plant debuted its newly developed vertical farming system housed in an abandoned meatpacking building in Chicago, Illinois. The utilization of abandoned buildings to house vertical farms and other sustainable farming methods are a fact of the rapid urbanization of modern communities.

In 2013 the Association for Vertical Farming (AVF) was founded in Munich (Germany). By May 2015, the AVF had expanded with regional chapters all over Europe, Asia, USA, Canada, and the United Kingdom. This organization unites growers and inventors to improve food security and sustainable development. The AVF focuses on advancing vertical farming technologies, designs, and businesses by hosting international info-days, workshops, and summits.

In 2015 the London company, Growing Underground, began the production of leafy green produce underground in abandoned underground World War II tunnels.

In 2016, a startup called Local Roots launched the "TerraFarm", a vertical farming systems hosted in a 40-foot shipping container, which includes computer vision integrated with an artificial neural network to monitor the plants; and is remotely monitored from California. It is claimed that the TerraFarm system "has achieved cost parity with traditional, outdoor farming" with each unit producing the equivalent of "three to five acres of farmland", using 97% less water through water recapture and harvesting the evaporated water through the air conditioning. The first vertical farm in a US grocery store opened in Dallas, Texas in 2016, now closed.

In 2017, a Japanese company, Mirai, began marketing its multi-level vertical farming system. The company states that it can produce 10,000 heads of lettuce a day—100 times the amount that could be produced with traditional agricultural methods because their special purpose LED lights can decrease growing times by a factor of 2.5. Additionally, this can all be achieved with 40% less energy usage, 80% less food waste, and 99% less water usage than in traditional farming methods. Further requests have been made to implement this technology in several other Asian countries. As of 2021, Bowery Farming is the largest indoor vertical farming company in the United States.

Energy costs 
In 2022, multiple firms reduced their operations (Appharvest, Infarm), or exited the market (Glowfarms), due to rapid increases in energy prices. Firms shifted their focus to regions with severe water constraints and/or lower energy costs. Florida-based Kalera received a delisting notice from NASDAQ. IronOX laid off staff and Fifth Season exited the market. Increased energy costs were frequently cited as a source of problems.

Advantages

Efficiency 
Traditional farming's arable land requirements are too large and invasive to remain sustainable for future generations. With the rapid population growth rates, it is expected that arable land per person will drop about 66% in 2050 in comparison to 1970. Vertical farming allows for, in some cases, over ten times the crop yield per acre than traditional methods. Unlike traditional farming in non-tropical areas, indoor farming can produce crops year-round. All-season farming multiplies the productivity of the farmed surface by a factor of four to six, depending on the crop. With crops such as strawberries, the factor may be as high as 30.

Vertical farming also allows for the production of a larger variety of harvestable crops because of its usage of isolated crop sectors. As opposed to a traditional farm where one type of crop is harvested per season, vertical farms allow for a multitude of different crops to be grown and harvested at once due to their individual land plots.

According to the USDA, vertical farm produce only travels a short distance to reach stores compared to traditional farming method produce.

The United States Department of Agriculture predicts the worldwide population to exceed 9 billion by 2050, most of which will be living in urban or city areas. Vertical farming is the USDA's predicted answer to the potential food shortage as the population increases. This method of farming is environmentally responsible by lowering emission and reducing needed water. This type of urban farming that would allow for nearly immediate farm-to-store transport would reduce distribution costs and shorten produce travel time.

In a workshop on vertical farming put on by the USDA and the Department of Energy experts in vertical farming discussed plant breeding, pest management, and engineering. Control of pests (like insects, birds, and rodents) is easily managed in vertical farms because the area is so well-controlled. Without the need for chemical pesticides the ability to grow organic crops is easier than in traditional farming.

Resistance to weather 
Crops grown in traditional outdoor farming depend on supportive weather and suffer from undesirable temperatures, rain, monsoon, hailstorm, tornado, flooding, wildfires, and drought. "Three recent floods (in 1993, 2007 and 2008) cost the United States billions of dollars in lost crops, with even more devastating losses in topsoil. Changes in rain patterns and temperature could diminish India's agricultural output by 30 percent by the end of the century."

The issue of adverse weather conditions is especially relevant for arctic and sub-arctic areas like Alaska and northern Canada where traditional farming is largely impossible. Food insecurity has been a long-standing problem in remote northern communities where fresh produce has to be shipped large distances resulting in high costs and poor nutrition. Container-based farms can provide fresh produce year-round at a lower cost than shipping in supplies from more southerly locations with a number of farms operating in locations such as Churchill, Manitoba, and Unalaska, Alaska. As with disruption to crop growing, local container-based farms are also less susceptible to disruption than the long supply chains necessary to deliver traditionally grown produce to remote communities. Food prices in Churchill spiked substantially after floods in May and June 2017 forced the closure of the rail line that forms the only permanent overland connection between Churchill and the rest of Canada.

Environmental conservation 
Up to 20 units of outdoor farmland per unit of vertical farming could return to its natural state, due to vertical farming's increased productivity. Vertical farming would reduce the amount of farmland, thus saving many natural resources.

Deforestation and desertification caused by agricultural encroachment on natural biomes could be avoided. Producing food indoors reduces or eliminates conventional plowing, planting, and harvesting by farm machinery, protecting soil, and reducing emissions.

Traditional farming is often invasive to the native flora and fauna because it requires such a large area of arable land. One study showed that wood mouse populations dropped from 25 per hectare to 5 per hectare after harvest, estimating 10 animals killed per hectare each year with conventional farming. In comparison, vertical farming would cause nominal harm to wildlife because of its limited space usage.

Problems

Economics 
Vertical farms must overcome the financial challenge of large startup costs. The initial building costs could exceed $100 million for a 60 hectare vertical farm. Urban occupancy costs can be high, resulting in much higher startup costs  – and a longer break even time – than for a traditional farm in rural areas.

Opponents question the potential profitability of vertical farming. In order for vertical farms to be successful financially, high-value crops must be grown since traditional farms provide low-value crops like wheat at cheaper costs than vertical farms. Louis Albright, a professor in biological and environmental engineering at Cornell stated that a loaf of bread that was made from wheat grown in a vertical farm would cost US$27. However, according to the US Bureau of Labor Statistics, the average loaf of bread cost US$1.296 in September 2019, clearly showing how crops grown in vertical farms will be noncompetitive compared to crops grown in traditional outdoor farms. In order for vertical farms to be profitable, the costs of operating these farms must decrease or the price of traditional farming must increase. The developers of the TerraFarm system produced from second-hand, 40-foot shipping containers claimed that their system "has achieved cost parity with traditional, outdoor farming".

A theoretical 10-story vertical wheat farm could produce up to 1,940 tons of wheat per hectare compared to a global average of 3.2 tons of wheat per hectare (600 times yield). Current methods require enormous energy consumption for lighting, temperature, humidity control, carbon dioxide input and fertilizer and consequently the authors concluded it was "unlikely to be economically competitive with current market prices".

According to a report in The Financial Times , most vertical farming companies have been unprofitable, except for a number of Japanese companies.

Energy use
During the growing season, the sun shines on a vertical surface at an extreme angle such that much less light is available to crops than when they are planted on flat land. Therefore, supplemental light would be required. Bruce Bugbee claimed that the power demands of vertical farming would be uncompetitive with traditional farms using only natural light. Environmental writer George Monbiot calculated that the cost of providing enough supplementary light to grow the grain for a single loaf would be about $15. An article in the Economist argued that "even though crops growing in a glass skyscraper will get some natural sunlight during the day, it won't be enough" and "the cost of powering artificial lights will make indoor farming prohibitively expensive". Moreover, research in 2007 on the Science Barge urban farming project led Ted Caplow to conclude that "generating enough electricity using solar panels requires an area about 20 times larger than the area being illuminated", which will be hard to accomplish with larger vertical farms. A hydroponic farm growing lettuce in Arizona would require  of energy per kilogram of lettuce produced. To put this amount of energy into perspective, a traditional outdoor lettuce farm in Arizona only requires 1100 kJ of energy per kilogram of lettuce grown.

As the book by Dr. Dickson Despommier The Vertical Farm proposes a controlled environment, heating, and cooling costs will resemble those of any other multiple story building. Plumbing and elevator systems are necessary to distribute nutrients and water. In the northern continental United States, fossil fuel heating costs can be over $200,000 per hectare. Research conducted in 2015 compared the growth of lettuce in Arizona using conventional agricultural methods and a hydroponic farm. They determined that heating and cooling made up more than 80% of the energy consumption in the hydroponic farm, with the heating and cooling needing 7400 kJ per kilogram of lettuce produced. 
According to the same study, the total energy consumption of the hydroponic farm is 90,000 kJ per kilogram of lettuce. If the energy consumption is not addressed, vertical farms may be an unsustainable alternative to traditional agriculture.

The energy requirements of vertical farming lead to significant land use to provide the energy. For every acre of crops grown via vertical farming, 5.4 acres of solar panels would be required to supply the energy via solar power. Thus in practice, vertical farming may require more land than traditional farming, not less.

Solutions

There are a number of interrelated challenges with some potential solutions:

 Carbon emission: A vertical farm requires a CO2 source, most likely from combustion if colocated with electric utility plants; absorbing CO2 that would otherwise be jettisoned is possible. Greenhouses commonly supplement carbon dioxide levels to 3–4 times the atmospheric rate. This increase in CO2 increases photosynthesis at varying rates, averaging 50%, contributing not only to higher yields but also to faster plant maturation, shrinking of pores, and greater resilience to water stress (both too much and little). Vertical farms need not exist in isolation, hardier mature plants could be transferred to traditional greenhouses, freeing up space and increasing cost flexibility.
 Crop damage: Some greenhouses burn fossil fuels purely to produce CO2, such as from furnaces, which contain pollutants such as sulphur dioxide and ethylene. These pollutants can significantly damage plants, so gas filtration is a component of high production systems.
 Light pollution: Greenhouse growers commonly exploit photoperiodism in plants to control whether the plants are in a vegetative or reproductive stage. As part of this control, the lights stay on past sunset and before sunrise or periodically throughout the night. Single story greenhouses have attracted criticism over light pollution, though a typical urban vertical farm may also produce light pollution.
 Power needs: If power needs are met by fossil fuels, the environmental effect may be a net loss; even building low-carbon capacity to power the farms may not make as much sense as simply leaving traditional farms in place while burning less coal. Louis Albright argued that in a "closed-system urban farming based on electrically generated photosynthetic light", a pound of lettuce would result in 8 pounds of carbon dioxide being produced at a power plant, and 4,000 pounds of lettuce produced would be equivalent to the annual emissions of a family car. He also argues that the carbon footprint of tomatoes grown in a similar system would be twice as big as the carbon footprint of lettuce. However, lettuce produced in a greenhouse that allows for sunlight to reach the crops saw a 300 percent reduction in carbon dioxide emissions per head of lettuce. As vertical farm systems become more efficient in harnessing sunlight, they will produce less pollution.
 Ventilation: "Necessary" ventilation may allow CO2 to leak into the atmosphere, though recycling systems could be devised. This is not limited to humidity tolerant and humidity intolerant crop polyculture cycling (as opposed to monoculture).
 Water pollution: Hydroponic greenhouses regularly change the water, producing water containing fertilizers and pesticides that must be disposed of. Spreading the effluent over neighboring farmland or wetlands would be difficult for an urban vertical farm, while water treatment remedies (natural or otherwise) could be part of a solution.

See also

 Arcology
 Development-supported agriculture
 Folkewall
 Foodscaping
 Green wall
 Pot farming
 Terrace (agriculture), Terrace (gardening), and Terrace (building)
 Urban agriculture
 Urban horticulture

References

Agricultural economics
Emerging technologies
Aeroponics
Aquaponics
Hanging gardens
Sustainable agriculture
Sustainable technologies
Urban agriculture
Sustainable food system